The Farmers' and Exchange Bank is a historic commercial building in Charleston, South Carolina. Built in 1853–54, it is an architecturally distinctive building, with Moorish Revival features rarely seen in the United States. The building is recognizable for its use of muqarnas—characteristic of Persian and North African architecture—as well as its large arched windows and striking red sandstone facade. It was declared a National Historic Landmark in 1973.

Description and history
The Farmers' and Exchange Bank is located on the west side of East Bay Street in the Charleston Historic District. It is a two-story masonry structure, built out of brick and multiple shades of brownstone, with stucco finish. Its main facade is three bays wide, each bay taken up by a tall arched opening with Moorish features. The first floor openings have a contoured shape, with circular windows above entries with intricately carved doors. The second-floor openings are similar, with the upper circular portion having a scalloped edge, and the arches filled with large multi-pane fixed windows.

The building was designed by Edward C. Jones and Francis D. Lee, both Charleston architects, and was completed in 1854. Its design is probably based on depictions of Moorish architecture published in Washington Irving's The Alhambra, which was published around that time. It was for some time thought to have been influenced by the Regency architecture of Great Britain, specifically the "Hindu" influence of buildings of that period such as the Royal Pavilion in Brighton, but the architects have been judged unlikely to have been exposed to such influences.

The structure was considered for demolition in the early 1970s but Charleston banker Hugh Lane Sr. contributed $50,000 toward its restoration.

See also

 List of National Historic Landmarks in South Carolina
 National Register of Historic Places listings in Charleston, South Carolina

References

External links
 Farmers' and Exchange Bank, Charleston County (141 E. Bay St., Charleston), at South Carolina Department of Archives and History
 Historic Charleston's Religious and Community Buildings, a National Park Service Discover Our Shared Heritage Travel Itinerary

National Historic Landmarks in South Carolina
Buildings and structures in Charleston, South Carolina
Commercial buildings completed in 1854
Moorish Revival architecture in South Carolina
National Register of Historic Places in Charleston, South Carolina
1854 establishments in South Carolina
Historic district contributing properties in South Carolina
Commercial buildings on the National Register of Historic Places in South Carolina